Chef or The Chef is the nickname or pseudonym of:

 "Chef", nickname of English cricketer Alastair Cook
 "Chef", nickname of American basketball player Stephen Curry
 "Chef", nickname of American basketball player James Harden
 Chef Henny (born 1996), American rapper, chef, and internet personality
 Chef James (born 1988), Venezuelan chef, television personality, restaurateur, and author
 Chef Jolly, Indian Executive Chef at JW Marriott and celebrity chef
 Chef Pepín (born 1948), Spanish media personality and self-taught chef
 Chef Ra (1950–2006), American cannabis advocate and cannabis foods writer for High Times magazine
 Chef Tone (born 1983), American songwriter and record producer
 Chef Tony (born 1954), American advertising pitchman for cooking and kitchen products primarily on infomercials and home shopping channels
 Chef Wan (born 1958), Singapore-born Malaysian celebrity chef
The Chef, a pseudonym of songwriter Bilal Hajji, also known as Bilal "The Chef" Hajji
The Chef, a pseudonym of the American rapper Raekwon of Wu-Tang Clan

See also 
 
 

Lists of people by nickname